The Knight of San Marco (Italian: Il cavaliere di San Marco) is a 1939 Italian historical drama film directed by Gennaro Righelli and starring Mario Ferrari, Dria Paola and Laura Nucci. It is set during the Risorgimento.

It was made at Cinecittà, with sets designed by Alfredo Montori.

Cast

References

Bibliography 
 Piero Zanotto. Veneto in film: il censimento del cinema ambientato nel territorio, 1895-2002. Marsilio, 2002.

External links 
 

1939 films
1930s historical films
Italian historical films
1930s Italian-language films
Films directed by Gennaro Righelli
Films set in the 19th century
Films shot at Cinecittà Studios
Italian black-and-white films
1930s Italian films